Buck House may refer to:

in Sri Lanka
Buck House, a house of S. Thomas' College, Mount Lavinia

in the United Kingdom
Buckingham Palace, formerly known as Buckingham House
Buck House Merton Bank, Douglas, Isle of Man, one of Isle of Man's Registered Buildings

in the United States
Buck House (Los Angeles), California, a Los Angeles Historic-Cultural Monument
Frank LaVerne Buck House, Pacific Grove, California
Will H. Buck House, Vacaville, California
Darnall's Chance, Upper Marlboro, Maryland, also known as the Buck House
Charles Buck House, Stoneham, Massachusetts
Ephraim Buck House, Wilmington, Massachusetts
Jesse H. Buck Farm House, Swartz Creek, Michigan listed on the National Register of Historic Places (NRHP)
Napoleon Buck House, Lafayette County, Missouri
Jeremiah Buck House, Bridgeton, New Jersey
Buck House NYC, Manhattan, New York
David M. Buck House, Yancey County, North Carolina
Green Hills Farm, Bucks County, Pennsylvania, also known as the Pearl S. Buck House
A.W. Buck House, Ebensburg, Pennsylvania
Buck's Upper Mill Farm, Bucksville, South Carolina, also known as the Henry Buck House
Lufkin Land-Long Bell-Buck House, Lufkin, Texas, listed on the NRHP

See also
Pearl S. Buck House (disambiguation)
Buckingham House (disambiguation)